Matutuíne District is a district of Maputo Province in southern Mozambique. The principal town is Bela Vista. The district is located in the south of the province, and borders with the city of Maputo in the north, the province of KwaZulu-Natal of South Africa in the south, Eswatini in the west, and with Namaacha and Boane Districts in the northwest. In the east, the district is limited by the Indian Ocean. This is the southernmost district of Mozambique. It has a population of 37,165 as of 2007.

Geography
The principal rivers in the district are the Maputo River and the Tembe River. There are several lakes in the district.

History
The area has been recorded in the 17th century as populated by Machavane people. In the 18th century it was conquered by a local chief Maputsu. In the 19th century the state he established still existed and was paying tribute to the Zulu Kingdom. Subsequently, the Portuguese took over the administration.

In the 1940s, the district was divided into three postos, in the 1960s one more was added.

Demographics
As of 2005, 39% of the population of the district was younger than 15 years. 38% of the population spoke Portuguese. The most common mothertongue among the population was Xichangana. 64% were analphabetic, mostly women.

Administrative divisions
The district is divided into five postos, Missevene (four localities, including Bela Vista), Catembe-Nsime (two localities), Catuane (two localities), Machangulo (two localities), and Zitundo (two localities).

Economy
3% of the households in the district have access to electricity.

Agriculture
In the district, there are 7,000 farms which have on average  of land. The main agricultural products are corn, cassava, cowpea, peanut, and sweet potato.

Transportation

A new port primarily for the export of coal was approved in 2009.

References 

Districts in Maputo Province